The Constitutional Court of the Republic of Uzbekistan is the supreme constitutional court of Uzbekistan. Its tasks include reviewing whether proposed laws conflict with the Constitution of Uzbekistan, and whether laws of the Republic of Karakalpakstan conflict with the laws of the Republic of Uzbekistan.  Under Article 95 of the Constitution, it is also tasked with authority to approve the President of Uzbekistan's decision to dissolve the Oliy Majlis. The court's decisions are final and unappealable.

The court is made up of seven judges, including the chairman and deputy chairman. One of the judges must be a representative of Karakalpakstan. The Senate of Uzbekistan elects the judges by majority vote, from among candidates recommended by the Supreme Judicial Council and nominated by the president. They are elected to terms of 5 years. The judges elect the chairman and deputy chairman from among themselves. The chairman of the court since 2014 (re-elected in 2017) has been Mirbabaev Bakhtiyar. 

The law establishing the Constitutional Court was adopted on May 6, 1993. A second law was adopted in 1995, and the first judges were elected to the court in December 1995. The current law on the Constitutional Court was adopted by the Supreme Assembly in 2017.

References

External links 
Official site

Law of Uzbekistan
Uzbekistan